Delta City is a census-designated place and unincorporated community located on Mississippi Highway 434 in Sharkey County, Mississippi. Although an unincorporated community, Delta City has a zip code of 39061.

It was first named as a CDP in the 2020 Census which listed a population of 70.

Demographics

2020 census

Note: the US Census treats Hispanic/Latino as an ethnic category. This table excludes Latinos from the racial categories and assigns them to a separate category. Hispanics/Latinos can be of any race.

Education
It is a part of the South Delta School District, which operates South Delta High School.

References

Unincorporated communities in Sharkey County, Mississippi
Unincorporated communities in Mississippi
Census-designated places in Sharkey County, Mississippi